Madrasa Sirajul Uloom , Sambhal is an old Madrasa (theological Institute) established in Sambhal city of Uttar Pradesh, India. It was established by Maulana Khaleel Ahmad Israili back in 1902 AD  in the commemoration of Maulana Siraj Israili, his middle name Siraj serves as the eponym for Sirajul Uloom. Among its alumni, Manzoor Nomani, Burhanuddin Sambhali and Maulana Asad Israili are famous for their contribution in the field of theology Freedom fighter Maulana Ismail Sambhali also studied Dars-i Nizami in Madrasa Sirajul Uloom

Faculties
There are six Islamic educational faculties at Madrasa Sirajul Uloom:

Shoba e Dars e Nizami (Dept. of Islamic law studies)
Shoba e Arbi jadeed (Dept. of Modern Arabic language)
Shoba e Niswan (Separate section for Girls)
Shoba e Hifz o Tajweed (Dept. of Qur'an recitation studies)
Foqaniya (Upper Primary section)
Tahtaniya(Primary Section)

See also
Government Degree College Sambhal
Darul Uloom Nadwatul Ulama
Darul Uloom Deoband

References

External links
  madrasa Sirajul uloom official website
 Centre for Distance Education

Madrasas in India
Education in Sambhal
Educational institutions established in 1902
1902 establishments in India
Caravanserais in India